Polom is a village in the municipality of Gornji Milanovac, Serbia. According to the 2002 census, the village has a population of 275 people.

Notable people
Milorad Drašković
Pero  Petrović

References

Populated places in Moravica District